Ness Botanic Gardens are near the cities of Liverpool and Chester on the English-Welsh border in the Wirral Peninsula. They occupy a site of 64 acres overlooking the Dee Estuary. The Ness Botanic Gardens were created by Arthur Kilpin Bulley (1861-1942), a wealthy cotton trader from Liverpool and benefited from collections by many plant hunters including George Forrest and Frank Kingdon-Ward.

Arthur Bulley began to create the garden in 1898.  In 1948, a few years after his death, his daughter Lois, gave the gardens, to the University of Liverpool, under a Conditional Trust.  One condition of the Trust is that the gardens must remain open to the public.  They are on the National Register of Historic Parks and Gardens and are Grade II. The gardens have many fine specimen trees and flowers. Magnolias, rhododendron, witch-hazels and camellias are some of the notable plant-hunted species in the garden.  Snowdrop walks are conducted during the flowering season.

See also

List of parks and open spaces in Cheshire

References

External links

 Ness Botanic Gardens

Gardens in Cheshire
University of Liverpool
Botanical gardens in England
Neston